Maarten van der Weijden (born 31 March 1981) is a Dutch long distance and marathon swimmer born in Alkmaar. In 2019 Van der Weijden swam the Elfstedentocht for charity. He raised more than €6.1 million.

Swimming career
Van der Weijden was known as a promising swimming talent in his youth, becoming Dutch national champion at the 1500 m freestyle (1998 (short course and long course), 1999 (lc) and 2000 (lc)), 400 m freestyle (1999 (sc+lc) and 2000 (lc)) and 5 km open water (2000). He also participated at the 1999 European Junior Championships and the 2000 Open Water World Championships. In 2001, he was confronted with leukemia and his career was likely to be over. After surviving cancer, he made his comeback in 2003. He qualified for the Open Water World Championships in Barcelona and won another three Dutch titles; 800 m freestyle (sc+lc) and 1500 m freestyle (lc). He became seventh over 10 and 25 kilometres at the 2004 World Open Water Championships and added a Dutch title at the 800 m freestyle (lc) and 25 km open water.

Later in 2004, he swam across the IJsselmeer in 4:20.58 hours, breaking the former record by almost 15 minutes to collect €50,000, which he donated to cancer research. In 2005, he won the Dutch title over 400 m freestyle (sc) for the second time in his career. He finished in fifth position at the World Open Water Championships over 10 km and sixth over 25 km. He also won three World Cup meetings in Ismaila, Al Fujeirah and Dubai. In 2006 he won a silver medal at the 2006 European Aquatics Championships over 10 km.

Van der Weijden had his own website named "Maarten van der Weijden zwemt tegen kanker" (Maarten van der Weijden swims against cancer) where he informed his fans about his life and his career. He also collected more money for cancer research. He won another World Cup race in Rosario, Argentina in January 2007. At the end of the World Cup calendar he finished in second position overall and during the 2007 World Championships over 10 km he finished seventh.

His aim was to become World Champion and he fulfilled this aim when he won the 25 km at the 2008 World Championships in Seville. He also won a bronze medal at the 5 km there and became fourth at the 10 km. This result qualified him for the 10 km open water marathon race at the 2008 Summer Olympics in Beijing. There he won the gold medal on 21 August, narrowly edging out David Davies of Great Britain.

He announced the end of his professional swimming career during his acceptance speech as Dutch Sportsman of the year in 2008.

On 22–23 May 2017, in Amsterdam, Van der Weijden attempted to break the world record for 24 hours swimming. He finished the nonstop swimming marathon, but he did not succeed in breaking the world record of 102 kilometers. He completed 99.5 kilometers in 24 hours. With this achievement he collected €8,500 for the benefit of cancer research. In March 2018 he tried to break the world record again: he succeeded. by swimming 102.8 kilometers in 24 hours.

In August 2018, Van der Weijden started an attempt to swim the entire track of the Elfstedentocht, a famous 200 km outdoor ice skating race in the north of the Netherlands. The purpose of this event was to raise funds for cancer research. Sponsors were invited to swim along with him for portions of the distance. The day before the event, the organizers and health experts concluded that due to E. coli the water quality was too poor for the sponsors to swim; Van der Weijden decided to make his attempt, without the sponsors swimming along. He scheduled this attempt to take three days, while only taking short naps - but taking slightly longer (three hour) breaks was necessary to continue. The attempt was live streamed by the national broadcaster NOS on their website and closely followed in national news. Eventually, with less than 10 km left to Dokkum, he had to cut his attempt short due to illness sustained in the water. At that moment, he already had swum a distance of 163 km in 55 hours time raising over €4,3 million for cancer charities. By October the total had reached €5 million.

On 27 March 2019 Van der Weijden announced that on 21 June 2019 he would start a second attempt to swim the whole eleven-city tour. His second attempt turned out to be successful. Van der Weijden arrived after 74 hours and 4 minutes at the finish in Leeuwarden on 24 June 2019. By the end of his swim, he had raised €3,910,763.11 for cancer charities. By the next day, 25 June, it was announced that €5.1 million had come in. On 28 June the total had reached over €6.1 million.

Political career
In the 2017 Dutch general election, Van der Weijden was a Lijstduwer for the People's Party for Freedom and Democracy.

See also 
 List of Dutch records in swimming

References

External links
 
 Biography on Zwemkroniek.com 
 
 
 
 
 

1981 births
Living people
Dutch male freestyle swimmers
Sportspeople from Alkmaar
Dutch male long-distance swimmers
Olympic swimmers of the Netherlands
Swimmers at the 2008 Summer Olympics
Olympic gold medalists for the Netherlands
Medalists at the 2008 Summer Olympics
Members of the People's Party for Freedom and Democracy
Olympic gold medalists in swimming
21st-century Dutch people